NGC 7090 is a spiral galaxy in the southern constellation of Indus located about 31 million light-years away. English astronomer John Herschel first observed this galaxy on 4 October 1834.

The morphological class of NGC 7090 is Scd, indicating it is a spiral with loosely-wound and somewhat disorganized arms. The galactic plane is inclined at an angle of 89° to the line of sight from the Earth, giving it an edge-on view. The combined mass of the stars in this galaxy is 5.5 billion times the mass of the Sun (M☉), while the star formation rate is ·yr−1. As a result of star formation, the diffuse ionized gas in the galaxy has a complex organization, showing filaments, bubbles, and super-shells.

Three transient ultraluminous X-ray sources have been detected in NGC 7090.

Gallery

References

External links 
 

Unbarred spiral galaxies
67045
7090
Indus (constellation)